Loose Creek is a stream in Osage County, Missouri in the United States.

The stream source area is along the northwest side of Pea Ridge southwest of Linn. The stream flows west-northwest parallel and south of U.S. Route 50 until turning sharply north and passing under Route 50 just east of the community of Loose Creek. The stream meanders northward passing under Missouri Route W and about midway between Bonnets Mill and Frankenstein. The stream flows under Route C and then veers sharply west to enter the Missouri Floodplain due east of Tebbetts on the north side of the river.

Loose Creek is a corruption of L'Ours Creek, so named for a French pioneer who settled on the creek.

See also
 List of rivers of Missouri

References

Rivers of Osage County, Missouri
Rivers of Missouri